IndyCar Series is a racing simulator developed by Codemasters. The game was released in 2003 for Microsoft Windows, PlayStation 2, and Xbox. The game is based on the 2002 Indy Racing League. A sequel to the game, IndyCar Series 2005, was released in 2004 for PlayStation 2, Xbox, and Windows based on the 2003 IndyCar Series. For PC, the recommended requirements are Windows 98, Millennium, 2000 and XP, but the game also works with Windows Vista and Windows 7.

Gameplay
The gameplay is basically racing in oval circuits with an IndyCar single-seater car, choose one team and compete into Quick Races, Championship mode, Test Drive, etc. around the official oval tracks based on the IndyCar 2003 calendar, take the finish line and score points based on the player's finish position.

Drivers
The game features 26 drivers from the 2002 Indy Racing League. The driver list includes 24 of the regular teams and drivers along with two of the Indy 500 only entries from Target Chip Ganassi Racing and Team Green.

Reception

The game received "average" reviews on all platforms according to the review aggregation website Metacritic. Eurogamers Roman Jennings described the PlayStation 2 version not as open-wheel racing game as Formula One 2003 nor arcade like Burnout 2, but as a well made racing sim game.

References

External links

2003 video games
PlayStation 2 games
Xbox games
Windows games
IndyCar Series video games
Codemasters games
Racing video games
Multiplayer and single-player video games
Video games developed in the United Kingdom